San Juanico Strait is a narrow strait in the Eastern Visayan region in the Philippines. It separates the islands of Samar and Leyte and connects the Carigara Bay (Samar Sea) with the San Pedro Bay (Leyte Gulf).

The strait is crossed by the San Juanico Bridge. The Tacloban City harbor, the main port of the Eastern Visayas, is on Cancabato Bay at the southern entrance of the strait.

Gallery

References

External links
 

Straits of the Philippines
Landforms of Leyte (province)
Landforms of Samar (province)